Stadion Gdańsk, known for sponsorship reasons as the Polsat Plus Arena Gdańsk since May 2021, is a football stadium in Gdańsk, Pomeranian Voivodeship, Poland. It is used mostly for football matches and is the home stadium of Lechia Gdańsk, which competes in the Ekstraklasa. The stadium is located at the Pokoleń Lechii Gdańsk 1 Street in the northern part of the city (Letnica district). The total capacity is 41,620 spectators, all seated and roofed. The stadium is the second largest arena in Ekstraklasa and the third largest in the country (after the Stadion Narodowy and the Stadion Śląski).

Construction of the stadium started in 2008 and was completed mid-2011. The opening match was between Lechia Gdańsk and Cracovia and ended with 1–1 draw. Its first international match was between Poland and Germany, took place on 6 September 2011 and ended 2–2. The match was relocated from Warsaw since the Stadion Narodowy was not ready. It has been used by Lechia Gdańsk since 'the White-and-Green' relocated there from the Gdańsk Sports Center Stadium.

The stadium was also one of the designated venues for the finals of UEFA Euro 2012. It hosted four matches during the tournament; three matches in Group C and one quarter-final match were played there. It was originally scheduled to host the 2020 UEFA Europa League Final, however following the COVID-19 pandemic in Europe the final was postponed and later rescheduled to August at the RheinEnergieStadion in Germany behind closed doors; Gdańsk hosted the 2021 final instead. Villarreal won the match, defeating Manchester United 12–11 on the penalty shootout.

Stadium characteristics

Overall

The stadium measures some 236 metres long, 203 metres wide and 45 metres high.

The arena's exterior is designed to resemble amber which has long been extracted on the Baltic coast. Whole roof construction is based on 82 girders. Roof structure has a total area of 44 000 m2. The facade and the roof are covered with 18 000 plates of polycarbonate multiwall sheet, in 6 shades, with a total area of 4.5 hectares. Two logos (placed on the western and eastern side of the stadium), are made in LED technology, with a height of 8 meters and length of 35 meters.

The pitch has dimensions of 105x68 meters, and its distance from the grandstand is 10.5 m behind the goals, and 8.5 m from the sidelines. The grandstands under the standards of FIFA and UEFA are covered, the center which is hovering over the field however will be uncovered. The issue of installing a sliding roof was considered, but the idea was abandoned due to costs and limited time to complete the construction. Remaining space is reserved for the other participants of the event (staff, etc.). The stadium meets the criteria for UEFA Category 4.

Capacity
Stadium capacity is 43,615 seats during league matches. However the total number of seats (gross) is approximately 44,000. During the UEFA European Football Championship in 2012 capacity was reduced to approximately 40 000 seats.

At the stadium there are 40 boxes behind glass where full catering is provided (so-called sky-boxes). Eight of them have an area of 60 m2 (646 ft²) and the remaining 32 have an area of 30 m2 (323 ft²). In addition to the sky-boxes, stadium offers 1383 seats of higher standard (VIP places) for the more affluent guests. Each of them is equipped with a comfortable seat and located just below the sky-boxes. Both sky-boxes and VIP places have a separate entrance with dedicated foyer.

The seats were provided by Polish company Forum Seating belonging to the Nowy Styl Group located in Krosno. Moreover, the stadium has 50 extra seats for disabled persons.

Name
In December 2009, the stadium's name was purchased by the Polish Energy Group (PGE) for 35 million złoty (about 8.5 million euro) for a duration of five years. The city of Gdańsk sold the naming rights in order to cover some of the costs of its construction. The only stipulation was that the name must include the word "Arena". The oil company Lotos and power company PGE were the final competitors for the sponsorship contract which also includes the display of the firm's logo in at least two locations at the top of the stadium, along with internal advertisements. The stadium was originally known as the Baltic Arena. The contract with PGE ended, however, on 30 September 2015, after PGE chose not to renew the contract. On 9 November 2015 Energa SA was revealed as the new stadium's sponsor until 2020. On 7 November 2020, The management board of Arena Gdańsk Operator sp.z o.o. announced the end of cooperation with Energa SA. From 21 May 2021, the stadium is called Polsat Plus Arena Gdańsk. The city's contract with the media and telecommunications companies Polsat and Plus was concluded for six years.

Baltic Arena (during construction)
PGE Arena Gdańsk (July 2010 – October 2015)
Arena Gdańsk (UEFA Euro 2012)
Stadion w Gdańsku Letnicy (October 2015 – November 2015)
Stadion Energa Gdańsk (November 2015 – November 2020)
Stadion w Gdańsku Letnicy (November 2020 – May 2021)
Polsat Plus Arena Gdańsk (May 2021 – present)

T29 Sports Bar & Restaurant
On 20 January 2012 after several months of preparation, a special club bar named T29 Sports Bar & Restaurant was opened to the public. This name is not a coincidence - it originates from the abbreviation of the previous Lechia Gdańsk stadium's address: Traugutta 29 and it is seen as a tribute for a venue where the history of 'the White-and-Green'  was made. Whole interior design is related to the different events which refers to the history of the club. The most distinctive parts of the design are two tremendous murals located opposite to each other on the sidewalls of the pub. Both paintings show an artistic interpretation of the panorama of the old Lechia stadium. T29 Sports Bar & Restaurant is situated in the north part of the stadium, just below the visiting team's supporters sector. The pub is a two-level construction with the total area of 800m2. There are 39’ TV- sets located on both stories of the pub. Every match of Lechia Gdańsk and other important sport events (incl. matches of Polish Ekstraklasa) are broadcast there every day. T29 Sports Bar & Restaurant is open for the visitors 7 days a week.

Construction history

The stadium was built specifically for the UEFA European Football Championship, which was held in 2012 in Poland and Ukraine. The first conceptual design of the stadium has been presented by the city of Gdańsk before the tournament host's choice.  On 31 January 2008 architect who had designed the stadium was selected. It was a company of Rhode-Kellermann-Wawrowsky from Düsseldorf, which designed such stadiums like Veltins-Arena in Gelsenkirchen and the AWD-Arena in Hannover. First part of construction documents were consisted of 92 volumes and the second one included next 137 volumes. Stadium specialist HPP Architects from Düsseldorf also contributed to the design development.

On 2 April 2008, work began on preparing the ground for the construction of the stadium, including liquidation of allotments, felling of trees and shrubs. On 15 December 2008 work started on the ground exchange and density of land for the construction of the stadium.

The official opening of the offers from companies willing to build new stadium took place on 25 March 2009. The offers prices varies form about 522 mln zł to 635 mln zł. Two days later a contract with the company who introduced the cheapest offer was signed. It was a consortium of companies: Hydrobudowa Polska S.A, Hydrobudowa 9, Alpine Bau Deutschland AG Berlin, Alpine Bau GmbH Austria, Alpine Construction Polska Sp. z o.o.

On 28 May 2009 when the main construction began. In mid-July the cornerstone was laid. Within the next year main steel and concrete structure was completed and the ceremony of topping out took place at 24 July 2010.

The original date of completion of the stadium was the end of 2010. On 9 June 2011, a match between the national teams of Poland and France was planned. Due to security reasons, the match was moved to Warsaw.

The stadium was opened at 19 July 2011. The first official football event on PGE Arena Gdańsk, as the Gdańsk City Stadium was then known, took place on 14 August 2011. The match between Lechia Gdańsk and KS Cracovia ended in 1:1 draw and the first goalscorer at the new stadium was Fred Benson.

Location & transport
The stadium is located in the northern part of the city, across the Martwa Wisła River, in the Letnica district. The main entrance is located on the side of newly created ul. Pokoleń Lechii Gdańsk (Generations of Lechia Gdańsk street).

Main roads that leading to the stadium are the ul. Marynarki Polskiej ("Polish Navy street") and the ul. Uczniowska. Getting to the stadium is easily possible by public transport, mainly due to tram lines # 7, 10 leading to tram stops Mostostal and Stadion or bus lines # 158, 283 leading to the bus stop Stadion. Selected courses of bus line # 158 stop along Generations of Lechia Gdańsk street on bus stops AmberExpo and Węzeł Harfa. In match days there are additional tram courses for the football fans.

Moreover, on every match day, special free of charge SKM (Fast Urban Railway) line leads from Gdańsk Główny railway station to Gdańsk Stadium Expo station located near the stadium. This line was modernized especially for the UEFA European Football Championship in 2012. It has been used for the first time, before and after the Ekstraklasa match between Lechia Gdańsk and Legia Warszawa which took place on May 3, 2012. It is worth noting that this line is also available for passengers in the days when the trade exhibition takes place in the new headquarters of the MTG SA Gdańsk International Fair Co. located next to the Gdańsk City Stadium.

Euro 2012 matches
The stadium was one of the venues for the UEFA Euro 2012. The three group C matches involving Spain were played there (with the other matches in that group played at City Stadium, Poznań), as well as one quarterfinal. During the finals, it was known as the 'Arena Gdansk' for sponsorship reasons.

The following matches were played at the stadium during the UEFA Euro 2012:

Poland national football team matches

So far, Poland national football team has played 10 matches in the arena. The stadium's opening match was due to be played against the French on 9 June 2011, but was moved to the Stadion Wojska Polskiego, as the stadium wasn't fully prepared. Instead, the match against Germany, which had been scheduled to be played at the Stadion Narodowy was moved to Gdansk (due to the fact that the stadium in Warsaw wasn't complete). In the first game for stakes played in Gdańsk, Poland drew 0–0 with Italy on 11 October 2020.

Concerts

Religious conventions

Controversies

Seat colour
Along initial design by Rhode-Kellermann-Wawrowsky, all seats were to create a mosaic of yellow and orange in various tones, which was to match the 'amber' facades and roof. However, after the final proposed layout was presented, Lechia Gdansk supporters launched a protest to block the move. As they argued, the stadium should be associated with their club's colours, not those of the arch-rival Arka Gdynia, who aren't tenants at the stadium. In a move to satisfy these claims, architects were asked to rethink the colors and came up with various tones of green. This was accepted by supporters and stayed intact with the overall concept as amber can also be greenish (though not usually found on Polish shores, more common in the Caribbean). Later, in October 2012, some seats were also painted white to read "LECHIA GDAŃSK" in order to allow fans to identify with the venue more.

Ban on bananas
In July 2012, the stadium became Poland's only (and probably one of very few worldwide) to have bananas on the list of items prohibited inside. Decision was made by Lechia Gdansk safety manager in order to prevent racist incidents. In April of that year, two black players of Lechia had bananas thrown at them.

This incident was a one-off, however, and was soon condemned by supporters as well as authorities. Even the attacked players expressed their lack of understanding for such a measure.

See also
Gdańsk Lech Wałęsa Airport
A1 motorway
List of football stadiums in Poland

References

External links

Stadion Gdańsk - official site 
Official Gdańsk city preparation website 
Official Gdańsk city coordinating company website
PGE Arena Gdańsk presentation at StadiumDB.com

Gdańsk
UEFA Euro 2012 stadiums in Poland
Sport in Gdańsk
Buildings and structures in Gdańsk
Tourist attractions in Gdańsk
Sports venues in Pomeranian Voivodeship
Sports venues completed in 2011